Weygoldtia is a genus of amblypygids of the family Charinidae, described in 2018 by Gustavo Silva de Miranda, Alessandro P.L. Giupponi, Lorenzo Prendini and Nikolaj Scharff. The genus is named after the German arachnologist Peter Weygoldt, in recognition of his contributions to the study of Amblypygi.

Species
, there are three species in this genus, all distributed in Southeast Asia.
 Weygoldtia consonensis Miranda, Giupponi, Prendini & Scharff, 2021 – Vietnam
 Weygoldtia davidovi (Fage, 1946) – Cambodia, Laos, Vietnam
 Weygoldtia hainanensis Zhu, Li & He, 2021 – China

References 

Amblypygi
Arachnid genera